The European SC (Short Course) Swimming Championships 2003 were held in the National Aquatic Centre in Blanchardstown, Fingal between 11 and 14 December.

Medal table

Men's events

Final 50 m freestyle

Final 100 m freestyle

Final 200 m freestyle

Final 400 m freestyle

Final 1500 m freestyle

Final 50 m backstroke

Final 100 m backstroke

Final 200 m backstroke

Final 50 m breaststroke

Final 100 m breaststroke

Final 200 m breaststroke

Final 50 m butterfly

Final 100 m butterfly

Final 200 m butterfly

Final 100 m individual medley

Final 200 m individual medley

Final 400 m individual medley

Final 4×50 m freestyle relay

Final 4×50 m medley relay

Women's events

Final 50 m freestyle

Final 100 m freestyle

Final 200 m freestyle

Final 400 m freestyle

Final 800 m freestyle

Final 50 m backstroke

Final 100 m backstroke

Final 200 m backstroke

Final 50 m breaststroke

Final 100 m breaststroke

Final 200 m breaststroke

Final 50 m butterfly

Final 100 m butterfly

Final 200 m butterfly

Final 100 m individual medley

Final 200 m individual medley

Final 400 m individual medley

Final 4×50 m freestyle relay

Final 4×50 m medley relay

External links
Results book
 Swim Rankings Results
Race-analysis by professor Rein Haljand

2003 in swimming
S
Swimming in the Republic of Ireland
2003
2003
European
December 2003 sports events in Europe